Joan Mary Last  (12 January 1908 – 9 October 2002) was an English music educator, author and  composer born in Littlehampton, Sussex. She studied piano with Mathilde Verne and made her debut as a pianist at the Aeolian Hall in London in 1926. After an injury to her hand ended her performing career, Last turned to teaching and composing. She taught music at the Royal Academy of Music and was awarded an OBE in 1988 for services to music education. She never married.

References

1908 births
Year of death missing
20th-century classical composers
British music educators
Women classical composers
English classical composers
Officers of the Order of the British Empire
People from Little Horsted
People from Littlehampton
British classical pianists
British women pianists
20th-century English composers
20th-century English women musicians
Women music educators
20th-century women composers
20th-century women pianists